María de la Luz Gómez Villalovos (born 24 December 1970) is a Mexican politician from the Institutional Revolutionary Party. In 2012, she served as a Deputy in the LXI Legislature of the Mexican Congress, representing Jalisco.

References

1970 births
Living people
Politicians from Jalisco
Women members of the Chamber of Deputies (Mexico)
Institutional Revolutionary Party politicians
21st-century Mexican politicians
21st-century Mexican women politicians
Deputies of the LXI Legislature of Mexico
Members of the Chamber of Deputies (Mexico) for Jalisco